Osaonica may refer to:

 Osaonica (Novi Pazar), a village in Serbia
 Osaonica (Trstenik), a village in Serbia